The ARIA Music Award for Best Music DVD, was an award presented at the annual ARIA Music Awards, which recognises "the many achievements of Aussie artists across all music genres", since 1987. It was handed out by the Australian Recording Industry Association (ARIA), an organisation whose aim is "to advance the interests of the Australian record industry." Best Music DVD was first presented in 2004, for work by a solo artist or group, at the ARIA Awards ceremony. For its final year, in 2011, it was presented at the ARIA Artisan Awards ceremony. Compilations were entered for this category. Content was at least 60% original. The release was eligible to appear on the ARIA Music DVD chart, which means "bonus disc" releases were not eligible.

Winners and nominees
In the following table, the winner is highlighted in a separate colour, and in boldface; the nominees are those that are not highlighted or in boldface.

References

External links
The ARIA Awards Official website

U